Ijichi (written: 伊地知 or 伊秩) is a Japanese surname. Notable people with the surname include:

, Japanese composer and music producer
, Japanese musician
, Japanese general

Japanese-language surnames